Sarah Saltzberg is an American actress and singer.

Personal
Saltzberg is a native of Needham, Massachusetts, and a graduate of Boston University's theatre performance program. Her brother, Adam Saltzberg, is a reality television producer. She also works as a real estate broker in New York.

Career
She made her Broadway debut in 2005 starring as Logainne Schwartzandgrubenierre in William Finn and Rachel Sheinkin's The 25th Annual Putnam County Spelling Bee, a role which she originated with improvisational comedy troupe The Farm. She had previously worked as a weekend nanny for playwright Wendy Wasserstein, whose influence helped bring William Finn and Rachel Sheinkin to the creative team of Spelling Bee.

She starred in and produced the improvisation and sketch comedy show Don't Quit Your Night Job at the Ha! Comedy Club in New York City in 2007. Also she appeared in the movie City Island as the Casting Director. Saltzberg is a writer of the Off-Broadway comedy Miss Abigail's Guide to Dating, Mating, and Marriage, which ran at the Downstairs Cabaret Theatre at Sofia’s from October 24, 2010 to June 30, 2012.

She has appeared off-Broadway as Helen in The Donkey Show, Cherry in Sinfully Rich, as Helena in A Midsummer Night's Dream, in 2005 in her one-woman show Dear Diary:The Making of Logainne Schwartzandgrubenairre (Broadway Spotlight Series, Ars Nova), 
 as well as throughout NYC in long-form improv comedy with the Upright Citizen's Brigade.

For the past ten years, Saltzberg has been teaching improvisation to students in grades K–5 at P.S. 6 on the Upper East Side.

References

External links
 Sarah Saltzberg fan community
 Interview on American Theatre Wing

Actresses from Massachusetts
American stage actresses
Boston University College of Fine Arts alumni
Living people
People from Needham, Massachusetts
Singers from Massachusetts
Year of birth missing (living people)
21st-century American women